In combinatorics, an area of mathematics, graph enumeration describes a class of combinatorial enumeration problems in which one must count undirected or directed graphs of certain types, typically as a function of the number of vertices of the graph. These problems may be solved either exactly (as an algebraic enumeration problem) or asymptotically.
The pioneers in this area of mathematics were George Pólya, Arthur Cayley and J. Howard Redfield.

Labeled vs unlabeled problems
In some graphical enumeration problems, the vertices of the graph are considered to be labeled in such a way as to be distinguishable from each other, while in other problems any permutation of the vertices is considered to form the same graph, so the vertices are considered identical or unlabeled. In general, labeled problems tend to be easier. As with combinatorial enumeration more generally, the Pólya enumeration theorem is an important tool for reducing unlabeled problems to labeled ones: each unlabeled class is considered as a symmetry class of labeled objects.

Exact enumeration formulas
Some important results in this area include the following.
The number of labeled n-vertex simple undirected graphs is 2n(n&hairsp;−1)/2.
The number of labeled n-vertex simple directed graphs is 2n(n&hairsp;−1).
The number Cn of connected labeled n-vertex undirected graphs satisfies the recurrence relation

from which one may easily calculate, for n = 1, 2, 3, ..., that the values for Cn are
1, 1, 4, 38, 728, 26704, 1866256, ...
The number of labeled n-vertex free trees is nn−2 (Cayley's formula).
The number of unlabeled n-vertex caterpillars is

Graph database 

Various research groups have provided searchable database that lists graphs with certain properties of a small sizes. For example

 The House of Graphs
 Small Graph Database

References

 
Enumerative combinatorics